Julia A. Vorholt (born September 15, 1969) is a full professor of microbiology at ETH Zurich and an elected member of the German Academy of Sciences Leopoldina.

Biography 
She earned her PhD in 1997 under professor Rudolf K. Thauer at the Max Planck Institute for Terrestrial Microbiology, for which she was awarded the Otto Hahn Medal, and is a German national residing in Switzerland. Following her Ph.D., she was a postdoctoral researcher with Mary Lidstrom at the University of Washington.

She is a member of the European Academy of Microbiology (EAM).

Research 
Current projects of the Vorholt lab at ETH Zurich include:
 Phyllosphere microbiology: Characterizing and understanding standing microbial communities on above-ground plant surfaces, and their impact on plant health and productivity.
 Metabolism of one-carbon compounds: The bacterial pathways that allow growth on single carbon compounds, especially methane and methanol.
 Bacterial stress response: Pathways and regulation of mechanisms involved in bacterial stress response.
 Single cell technologies: Development of microfluidics, in particular FluidFM, single cell force spectroscopy, and other techniques to gather data and manipulate individual cells.

In addition, work from her lab was significant in refuting previous claims by NASA scientists that the arsenic-tolerant bacteria GFAJ-1 could utilize arsenic instead of phosphorus in DNA and other essential biomolecules.

Selected publications 
As of 2013 she had 90 publications, and as of 2015 her work has been cited approximately 4100 times.

References

External links 
 

Living people
1969 births
Swiss microbiologists
German microbiologists
Women microbiologists
Academic staff of ETH Zurich
Members of the German Academy of Sciences Leopoldina